is an English tort law case, establishing the lender must publish/promote the materially beneficial key, intrinsic facts as to land in mortgage repossession sales. As it affects the duty of mortgagees (secured lenders), to that extent it can be considered within the periphery of English land law also.

The tripartite panel at appeal established negligence on the part of the lender or its auctioneer agent. A 2-1 majority directed an enquiry as to damages (as opposed to rough award ordered at first instance) to be carried out.

Facts
In 1961, Cuckmere Brick Co had received planning permission to build 100 flats each with a garage on a site of  near Maidstone, and received £50,000 mortgage financing from Mutual Finance who valued the land accordingly. By 1964, due to cash flow problems arising from other developments in which Cuckmere was involved, planning permission was subsequently received (with Mutual's approval) to build 35 houses, which would have incurred lower construction costs. Construction had still not commenced by 1966, and Mutual exercised power of sale under the mortgage, putting the land up for auction, and advertising that the property had planning permission for the houses, but not the flats. Cuckmere advised Mutual of the oversight, and the latter told the auctioneer to mention it. They got £44,000 at the auction, and Cuckmere argued that it should have been closer to £75,000 had the planning permission been mentioned properly in the advertisement, indeed had its existence, underpinning the bank's own valuation, been imparted to prospective buyers.

Cuckmere sued, asking for an account to be taken on the basis that the defendants should be debited with the price which they could and should have obtained for the site. Mutual counter-claimed for the balance of all moneys due under the mortgage with interest after crediting the plaintiffs with the proceeds of the sale. Plowman J found for the plaintiffs on the claim so as to eclipse the value of the counterclaim, accepting credible evidence that £65,000 was the price that could and should have been obtained for the land but for the defendants' default or failure to take reasonable precautions in relation to the sale.

Both parties appealed to the Court of Appeal.

Judgment
The appeal was allowed in part, being sent back to an inquiry as to damages, potentially to lower those awarded. The respondent borrower was awarded  of the costs of the appeal.

Generally agreeing on the applicable test, two Lord Justices of Appeal saw the case was returned for an inquiry as to damages, on the basis that the price at which the land could probably have been sold was still unclear (one judge used the fading language, "at large"), the third would have fully upheld the original damages award.

Salmon LJ held that Mutual Finance had breached its duty of care to Cuckmere. The duty is not to get the best or proper price, whatever that means, but ‘the true market value.’  This was the proposition of earlier High Court decision in Tomlin v Luce (1890) (the case was "followed").

Cross LJ agreed that the lender was also responsible for the conduct of its agent (the auctioneer) and either or both were negligent:

Equally Cairns LJ:

Followed or applied in
Bishop v Bonham [1988] CA (England and Wales) ("E")
AIB Finance Ltd v Debtors [1997]
Meftah v Lloyds TSB Bank plc [2001] 
Aodhcon LLP v Bridgeco Ltd [2014] Ch.D.

Dictum followed in
 American Express International Banking Corp v Hurley, [1985] 3 All ER 564

Considered in
 
 Parker-Tweedale v Dunbar Bank Plc, [1991] Ch 12
 
 Latchford v Beirne, [1981] 3 All ER 705 (QB)

Explained by the Privy Council in

See also

English land law
English trusts law
English property law

Notes

English land case law
Court of Appeal (England and Wales) cases
1971 in case law
1971 in British law
English tort case law